Nallavan is a 2010 Malayalam-language film written and directed by Aji John, and stars Jayasurya and Mythili. The film was a huge disaster in box office.

Plot 
The movie starts from the Kerala high court, when the police bring Kocherukkan (Jayasurya), a man who had committed two murders and escaped  jail four times, but is again caught by the police. He escapes yet again with the help of his friend Murukan (Sudheesh), and recollects his colourful memory.

Kocherukkan was a happy youth who lived an ordinary life in a quiet village somewhere in the border of Tamil Nadu and Kerala. He is in love with Malli (Mythili), an agile, adventurous, cheerful girl of 17. Both of them are orphans, and Malli has a landlord.

The tumultuous life of Kocherukkan and Malli takes a sudden change when Malli's landlord Chandrasheghara Vazhunnor (Sai Kumar) and his driver Devarajan (Vijayakumar) decide to get  her married to his relative Chitharanjan (Suraj Venjarammood). Malli and Kocherukkan elope with the help of Shaji (Bijukkuttan) and Shangu (Anoop Chandran), Kocherukkan’s friends. They meet a guy named Kumareshan (Siddique) on the way, who tries to kidnap Malli, but Kocherukkan hits him with a stone and they flee. They reach Pollachi and start living with Murukan. Kocherukkan and Malli go to the registrar's office to get married but since Malli was only 17 and Kocherukkan was 20, the registrar (Kochupreman) asks them to return after a year when they are legally entitled to get married.

A year later, Kocherukkan was spotted by Kumareshan, who was the police sub-inspector of the area and he arrests Kocherukkan for his personal enmity.  He puts false charges on Kocherukkan including immoral trafficking and robbery. But he runs off from the court to meet Malli and they get married. But he reports back to police the same day since police arrests Murukan instead of Kocherukkan and tortures him.

Kocherukkan is sent to the jail again. This time Malli gets to know from newspaper that Kocherukkan is a wanted criminal now. She returns to the landlord and dismisses her relation.  Kocherukkan escapes from jail again and finds Malli murdered in a desert. He is arrested again with one more crime of murder. Kumareshan also traps him in another murder, this time that of Vazhunnor with the help of Devarajan and Raghavan (Jayan Cherthala) who is an ex-prisoner in Kocherukkan's jail. In the court, Kocherukkan escapes again for the fifth time, questions Malli's stepfather Narayanan (Manianpilla Raju) and understands that Kumareshan is behind his Malli's murder. He goes to Kumareshan's house and kills both Raghavan and Devarajan. He calls Kumareshan and challenges him to meet him in the same place where he killed Malli. Kumareshan arrives at the place and tells him that he already killed Murukan and proceeds to show Murukan's body to Kocherukkan. Kocherukkan gets beaten up by Kumareshan at first, but when recollects how Kumareshan killed Malli and Murukan, Kocherukkan eventually fights back and kills Kumareshan. But before he could die, Kocherukkan asks Kumareshan that he could have proved his innocence to Malli before he could kill her. The police then arrives to arrest him but he runs away, and few  gunshots are heard, while the frame shows Kocherukkan joining hands and running away with Malli.

Cast 
 Jayasurya as Kocherukkan
 Mythili as Malli, Kocherukkan's love interest
 Siddique as Kumaresan, sub inspector
 Sudheesh as Murukan
 Suraj Venjaramood as Chitharanjan
 Bijukuttan as Shaji
 Sai Kumar as Chandrashekhara Vazhunnor, Malli's landlord
 Maniyanpilla Raju as Narayanan
 Anoop Chandran as Shangu
 Jayan Cherthala as Raghavan, prisoner
 Vijayakumar as Devarajan
 Kochu Preman as Santhosh, the registrar of the marriage office
 Bindu Panicker as Murukan's mother
 Sona Nair as Prosecutor Rajalakshmi Warrier
 Ambika Mohan as Chandrashekhara Vazhunnor's wife
 Baby Ester as Malli Jr

Soundtrack

The soundtrack of the film was composed by Mohan Sithara. "Pudichachu" is an "Adipoli dance" type Tamil/Malayalam song, "Thoomallike" is a romantic Malayalam song, and "Maayakkanavu" is an emotional Malayalam song.

References

External links

2010 films
2010s Malayalam-language films
Films directed by Aji John